Le Masnau-Massuguiès is a commune in the Tarn department in southern France.

Geography
The Dadou flows west-southwestward through the middle of the commune; it forms part of the commune's eastern and western borders.

See also
Communes of the Tarn department

References

Communes of Tarn (department)